Michael Addison, 3rd Viscount Addison (12 April 1914 – 23 March 1992), was a British civil servant and academic.

Addison was the second son of Christopher Addison, 1st Viscount Addison, and his first wife, Isobel Mackinnon Gray. His father, a physician and politician, was created a viscount in 1945. He was educated at Hele's School, Exeter, and Balliol College, Oxford.

He was in the Civil Service between 1936 and 1965. He served as an intelligence officer in the Second World War between 1941 and 1945 as a Flying Officer with the Royal Air Force Volunteer Reserve. He was a senior lecturer between 1965 and 1976 in the Polytechnic of Central London, School of Management Studies, London. He succeeded in the viscountcy on the death of his brother, who died with no male heir in 1976.

Lord Addison married Kathleen Wand, daughter of the Right Reverend Sir William Wand, on 22 August 1936, with whom he had the following children:

Hon. Eleanor Brigit Addison (b. 11 June 1938)
Hon. Caroline Ruth Addison (b. 30 July 1942)
William Matthew Wand Addison, 4th Viscount Addison (b. 13 June 1945)

He died in 1992 and was succeeded by his only son.

Arms

References

External links

1914 births
1992 deaths
People educated at Hele's School, Exeter
Alumni of Balliol College, Oxford
Academics of the University of Westminster
Royal Air Force officers
Royal Air Force Volunteer Reserve personnel of World War II
Civil servants in the Ministry of Labour
Civil servants in the Ministry of Supply
Civil servants in the Ministry of Aviation
Civil servants in HM Treasury
Michael